Phil Michael Robert Bass  (17 November 1950 in Banbury, England - 11 March 2006) was a former motorcycle speedway rider in National League (speedway) and British League.

Career
Phil Bass started his career with Scunthorpe Saints in 1972. He was the only rider to reach 200 points in what was a disappointing year for the Saints.
His next two years were with Long Eaton Speedway
He would have rides for British League teams but was never signed to ride as a full-time rider.
As the 1975 season ended, Harry Bastable and Tony Allsopp, promoters at Stoke, moved the licence to Oxford for 1976, when Oxford Rebels moved to White City Stadium when it was feared the stadium would be demolished.

References

External links

1952 births
2006 deaths
English motorcycle racers
British speedway riders
Oxford Cheetahs riders
Milton Keynes Knights riders